Bichoristes is a genus of sea snails, marine gastropod mollusks in the family Choristellidae.

Species
Species within the genus Bichoristes include:
 Bichoristes wareni McLean, 1992

References

Choristellidae
Monotypic gastropod genera